Bad Company: Music from the Motion Picture is the original soundtrack to Joel Schumacher's 2002 action comedy film Bad Company. It was released on June 4, 2002 via Hollywood Records and consisted mainly of hip hop and R&B music. The album found some success, peaking at number 98 on the Billboard 200, number 11 on the Top R&B/Hip-Hop Albums and number 9 on the Top Soundtracks, and featured one charting single "All Out of Love".

Track listing

Personnel 

Clifton Lighty – backing vocals (track 7)
Gordon Mills – guitar (track 4)
Wayne Nunes – bass guitar, guitar, keyboards, producer (track 12)
Perry Melius – drums, producer (track 12)
Rich Travali – mixing (track 1)
Adam Long – recording (track 1)
Herb Powers Jr. – mastering (track 1)
Trackboyz – producers (track 1)
Jason Cox – producer (track 2)
Tom Girling – producer (track 2)
Gorillaz – producer (track 2)
David Sheats – producer (track 3)
Dub Pistols – mixing & producer (track 4)
Eddie Berkeley – producer (track 5)
Keir "KayGee" Gist – producer (tracks: 5, 7, 8)
Willie "JL" Woods – producer (track 6)
Adam Kudzin – mixing & recording (track 7)
Addaryll "Tiger" Wilson – producer (track 7)
Bale'wa M Muhammad – producer (track 7)
Christopher Alan "Tricky" Stewart – producer (track 9)
Rodney "Don Vito" Richard – producer (track 9)
Timothy James Price – producer (track 10)
Antonina Armato – producer (track 10)
Adrian Nicholas Matthews Thaws – producer (track 11)
Robert Potter – recording (track 12)
Carlos "Six July" Broady – producer (track 13)
Steve Kempster – engineering (track 14)
Trevor Charles Rabinowitz – producer (track 14)
David Snow – art direction
Coco "Monster X" Shinomiya – design
Patricia Sullivan – mastering
Bob Badami – music supervisor
Kathy Nelson – music supervisor, producer
Mitchell Leib – producer
Jerry Bruckheimer – executive producer
Joel Schumacher – executive producer
Desirée Craig-Ramos – soundtrack coordination
Michael McQuarn – music consultant

References

External links

2002 soundtrack albums
Action film soundtracks
Hip hop soundtracks
Hollywood Records soundtracks
Rhythm and blues soundtracks
Albums produced by Tricky Stewart
Comedy film soundtracks